Gérard Loncke (15 January 1905 in Overpelt – 13 March 1979 in Neerpelt) was a Belgian professional road bicycle racer. In 1932 he finished 4th place in the Tour de France.

Major results
Source:

1930
Omloop der Vlaamse Gewesten
1931
Antwerp-Ghent-Antwerp
Tour de France:
Winner stage 7
1932
Lutlommel
Tour de France:
4th place overall classification
Winner stage 16
1933
Giro d'Italia:
Winner stages 7 and 16
1935
Scheldeprijs Vlaanderen
Deurne-Zuid
GP Stad Sint-Niklaas
Ans
Opglabbeek

References

External links 
 Official Tour de France results for Gérard Loncke

Belgian male cyclists
1905 births
1979 deaths
Belgian Tour de France stage winners
Belgian Giro d'Italia stage winners
People from Overpelt
Cyclists from Limburg (Belgium)